Willington is a village and civil parish located in the English county of Bedfordshire. It is west of Moggerhanger on the road from Sandy to Bedford. The village is recorded in the Domesday Book as Welitone and as Wilitona in c. 1150, from Old English tun (homestead) among the willows, and is part of the ancient hundred of Wixamtree.

In the parish church of St Lawrence there is a grand 16th-century chapel.

Willington is home to 16th century Willington Dovecote & Stables, both now owned by the National Trust. In addition, it is home to The Danish Camp, a restaurant set along the cycle route which holds an annual fireworks display on bonfire night (5 November). This is also the location of an ancient moated site.
Willington used to have a railway station on the Sandy to Bedford railway line, now part of the NCR 51 national cycle route.

References

External links

Willington dovecote and stables at the National Trust.
Willington station disused station site record
 "Danish Camp" riverside restaurant, & moated site
Willington pages at the Bedfordshire and Luton Archives and Records Service

Villages in Bedfordshire
Civil parishes in Bedfordshire
Borough of Bedford